The 1922 United States Senate elections were elections that occurred in the middle of Republican President Warren G. Harding's term. The 32 seats of Class 1 were contested in regular elections, and special elections were held to fill vacancies. With the Republicans divided between conservative and progressive factions, the Democrats gained six net seats from the Republicans while the Farmer–Labor party gained one. The Republicans retained their Senate majority.

Gains, losses, and holds

Retirements
Two Republicans and three Democrats retired instead of seeking re-election.

Defeats
Ten Republicans and three Democrats sought re-election but lost in the primary or general election.

Change in composition

Before the elections 
At the beginning of 1922.

After the elections

Race summaries

Special elections during the 67th Congress 
In these special elections, the winners were seated during 1922; ordered by election date.

Elections leading to the 68th Congress 
In these general elections, the winners were elected for the term beginning March 4, 1923; ordered by state.

All of the elections involved the Class 1 seats.

Closest races 
Fourteen races had a margin of victory under 10%:

The tipping point state is Pennsylvania with a margin of 25.5%.

Arizona

California

Connecticut

Delaware 

There were 2 elections in Delaware.

Delaware (special)

Delaware (regular)

Florida

Georgia (special)

Indiana

Iowa (special)

Maine

Maryland

Massachusetts

Michigan

Minnesota

Mississippi

Missouri

Montana

Nebraska

Nevada

New Jersey

New Mexico

New York

North Dakota

Ohio

Pennsylvania 

There were 3 elections in Pennsylvania.

Pennsylvania (special, class 1) 

One-term Republican Philander C. Knox died October 12, 1921 and Republican state senator William E. Crow was appointed October 24, 1921 to continue the term, pending a special election.  Crow then died August 2, 1922 and Republican attorney David A. Reed was appointed, also to continue the term, pending a special election.  Reed won that election as well as the election to the next term.

Pennsylvania (regular) 

Reed would serve until 1935.

Pennsylvania (special, class 3) 

Five-term Republican Boies Penrose died December 31, 1921 and Republican attorney George W. Pepper was appointed January 9, 1922 to continue the term, pending a special election, which he then won.

Pepper would only serve out that term, losing renomination in 1926.

Rhode Island

Tennessee

Texas

Utah

Vermont

Virginia

Washington

West Virginia

Wisconsin

Wyoming

See also
 1923 United States Senate elections
 1922 United States elections
 1922 United States House of Representatives elections
 67th United States Congress
 68th United States Congress

Notes

References